Diane Gilliam Fisher (born 1957) is an American poet. She is author of several poetry collections, most recently,  Kettle Bottom (Perugia Press, 2004).

Fisher was born and raised in Columbus, Ohio. She earned her bachelor's and master's degrees in Spanish and a Ph.D. in romance languages from Ohio State University, and an M.F.A. in creative writing from Warren Wilson College.  She lives in Akron, Ohio.

Works

Diane Gilliam Fisher has had her poems published in literary journals and magazines including Wind Magazine, Appalachian Journal, Shenandoah, and The Spoon River Poetry Review.

Her 2004 book Kettle Bottom received numerous honors, including a spot on the American Booksellers Association Book Sense 2005 Top Ten Poetry Books list, and inclusion in The Pushcart Prize XXX anthology.   Of Kettle Bottom, Catherine MacDonald says "Set in 1920–21, a period of violent unrest known as the West Virginia Mine Wars, the poems in Kettle Bottom combine compelling narratives with the charged, heightened language of lyric poetry. It is an unforgettable combination, one that characterizes the very best contemporary verse."

Diane won the $50,000 "Gift of Freedom" Award for her poetry from A Room of Her Own Foundation in March 2013.

Bibliography
Full-Length Poetry Collections
 Kettle Bottom (Perguia Press, 2004)
 One of Everything (Cleveland State University Poetry Center, 2003)

Chapbooks
 Recipe for Blackberry Cake (Kent State University Press, 1999)

Honors and awards
 2013  $50,000 Gift of Freedom Award from A Room of Her Own Foundation  
 2008 Thomas and Lillie D. Chaffin Award for Appalachian Writing
 2005 Ohioana Poetry Book Award
 2004 Perugia Press Prize
 2003 Ohio Arts Council Individual Artist’s Fellowship

References

External links
 Perugia Press, Author Page: Diane Gilliam Fisher
 Review:  Kettle Bottom by Diane Gilliam Fisher (Review by Catherine MacDonald, from Blackbird, Fall 2007, Vol. 6, No. 2)
 Review:  Kettle Bottom by Diane Gilliam Fisher (Review by Erin Murphy from Valparisio Poetry Review)

Living people
Poets from Ohio
Ohio State University College of Arts and Sciences alumni
Warren Wilson College alumni
1957 births
Appalachian writers
American women poets
21st-century American women